Albert Bennett Moore (April 17, 1908 – March 23, 1991) was an American football halfback who played one season with the Chicago Bears of the National Football League, in 1932. He played college football at Northwestern University and attended Washington High School in Portland, Oregon.

References

External links
Just Sports Stats

1908 births
1991 deaths
Players of American football from Portland, Oregon
American football halfbacks
Washington High School (Portland, Oregon) alumni
Northwestern Wildcats football players
Chicago Bears players